The following is a list of 2018 box office number-one films in Japan by week. When the number-one film in gross is not the same as the number-one film in admissions, both are listed.

Highest-grossing films

See also
List of Japanese films of 2018

References

2018
Japan
2018 in Japanese cinema